The Life Saving Society of Hong Kong is the life saving society in Hong Kong.

As Royal Life Saving Society Hong Kong Branch
The Life Saving Society began as a branch of the Royal Life Saving Society UK in 1950 and Hong Kong Life Guard Club created 1956.

The RLSS Hong Kong Branch was charged with training while the HKLGC was in charge of life guard service.

As Hong Kong Life Saving Society
The HKLSS was formed with the merger of the RLSS Hong Kong Branch and HKLGC with the current name in 1997 (required to break ties with RLSS before the handover).

HKLSS is a founding member of the International Life Saving Federation.

See also
Royal Life Saving Society UK
Royal Life Saving Society Australia
Royal Life Saving Society of Canada

References

External links
HKLSS homepage

Organizations established in 1956
Clubs and societies in Hong Kong
Lifesaving organizations
1956 establishments in Hong Kong